Souleyman Chebal Moctar or Souleyman Ould Chebal (born 31 December 1986) is a track athlete from Mauritania. His specialty is the 800 metres. He was the Mauritania team's flagbearer at the Beijing Olympics on 8 August 2008.

References

External links
 

1986 births
Living people
Mauritanian male middle-distance runners
Athletes (track and field) at the 2008 Summer Olympics
Olympic athletes of Mauritania